Phenylacetylene is an alkyne hydrocarbon containing a phenyl group. It exists as a colorless, viscous liquid. In research, it is sometimes used as an analog for acetylene; being a liquid, it is easier to handle than acetylene gas.

Preparation
In the laboratory, phenylacetylene can be prepared by elimination of hydrogen bromide from styrene dibromide using sodium amide in ammonia:

It can also be prepared by the elimination of hydrogen bromide from bromostyrene using molten potassium hydroxide. Yet another method involves the Sonogashira coupling of iodobenzene with trimethylsilylacetylene, followed by removal of the trimethylsilyl group using TBAF.

Reactions
Phenylacetylene is a prototypical terminal acetylene, undergoing many reactions expected of that functional group.  It undergoes semihydrogenation over Lindlar catalyst to give styrene.  In the presence of base and copper(II) salts, it undergoes oxidative coupling to give diphenylbutadiyne.  In the presence of metal catalysts, it undergoes oligomerization, trimerization, and even polymerization.

In the presence of gold or mercury reagents, phenylacetylene hydrates to give acetophenone:
PhC2H  +  H2O  →  PhC(O)CH3

See also
 Alkyne
 Alkyne trimerisation

References

Phenyl compounds
Ethynyl compounds
C2-Benzenes